Foxhill may refer to:

Foxhill, a hamlet in Wanborough parish, Wiltshire, England
Foxhill motocross circuit
Foxhill House, a historic house within Wokingham District but near the town of Reading, Berkshire, England
Foxhill Park, a regional park in Bowie, Maryland
Foxhill Park Bridge, an historic bridge in the park
 Foxhill, a locality in Combe Down, Bath, England

See also 
 Fox Hill (disambiguation)
 Fox Hills (disambiguation)